Hannah Eteson (died 1895) was an English librarian, the first woman to be appointed a public librarian in England.

Hannah Eteson became Chief Librarian at Blackpool public library in 1880. Eteson was "appointed at 18/- a week, with a little extra for cleaning." She served until 1891, when she was succeeded by her deputy, Kate Lewtas.

References

Year of birth missing
1895 deaths
English librarians
British women librarians